Pehowa is a town and a municipal committee in Kurukshetra district in the Indian state of Haryana. It is an important sacred Hindu pilgrimage site, related to Krishna and Mahabharata, within the 48 Kos Parikrama of Kurukshetra. The Hindu genealogy registers at Peohwa, Haryana are kept here at the Pruthudak Tirath on the banks of Sarasvati river.

History

Pehowa is an ancient city and its religious significance is mentioned in several puranas, such as Skanda Purana (1st to 5th century CE), Markandeya Purana (4th to 6th century CE) and Vamana Purana (5th to 11th century CE).

Two inscriptions dated ninth Century CE found at Pehowa mention that the place was controlled by Mahendrapala, of Kanauj and a Vishnu temple was constructed at this place by Tomara family, but such historic temple is not found in present day Pehowa. The earliest extant historical reference to the Tomara dynasty occurs in the Pehowa inscription issued during the reign of the Pratihara king Mahendrapala I (r. c. 885-910 CE) [Tomars of Delhi were vassals of Partiharas of Kannauj]. This undated inscription states that Jaula of the Tomara family became prosperous by serving an unnamed king. His descendants included Vajrata, Jajjuka, and Gogga. The inscription suggests that Gogga was a vassal of Mahendrapala I. It records the construction of three Vishnu temples by Gogga and his step-brothers Purna-raja and Deva-raja. The temples were located at Prithudaka (IAST: Pṛthūdaka; Pehowa), on the banks of the river Sarasvati. No information is available about the immediate successors of Gogga. The Pehowa inscription suggests that this particular Tomara family was settled around the Karnal area. However, F. Kielhorn suggested that this Tomara family actually resided in Delhi: they may have visited Pehowa on pilgrimage, and built a temple there.

Geography

It has an average elevation of 224 metres (734 feet). The Tehsil Pehowa was created on 1 November 1979 and is situated at a distance of 27 km in west from Kurukshetra. and 26 km North-west from Pundri

Demographics
 India census, Pehowa had a population of 38,853. Males constitute 52% of the population and females 48%. Pehowa has a literacy rate of 82.12%, higher than the Haryana average of 75.55%, with male literacy at 87%, and female literacy it 77%. In Pehowa, 11.72% of the population is under 6 years of age. Punjabi and Haryanvi dialects are spoken in the countryside, while Hindi is the most commonly spoken language.

Religious significance

Pehowa is considered a religious place of high importance and to highlight the sanctity of the place, Haryana State Government has banned sale, possession, consumption and purchase of non-vegetarian food in the town limits. Slaughtering of animals is also banned in the town through the court orders. During Mahabharta, soldiers who laid down their lives in the battle of Kurukshetra were cremated at Pehowa. Pehowa is considered a sacred place of pilgrimage for all Hindus as well as Sikhs too.

Prithudak Teerth

Prithudak is one of the important tirtha in the 48 kos parikrama of Kurukshetra.

Pehowa is a very ancient town, believed to pre-date the Mahabharat War by many centuries as it flourished on the banks of now dried up Saraswati River in those days. By the time of the Mahabharata war, the river had long dried up, yet was still a very holy place where people offered "Pinda Pradhan" to their ancestors. It is still called as "Pitrudhak Teerth" and was the holiest place for these oblations to be done much before Prayag or Gaya as the local legend goes. Lord Krishna is believed to have taken the Pandavas to this place before the war started and made them take the blessings of Sarasawati Mata and of their ancestors. The river, which in 2006 did not have any inflows nor outflows and was stagnant. was made perennial under Sarasvatio Revival Project. 

Saraswati Sarovar is located in this town, where people perform pooja and religious rituals. The Pillars on the entrance to the Saraswati Temple date many centuries. 

In 2021, Haryana Sarasvati Heritage Development Board initiated projects to develop 5 river fronts on the rejuvenated Sarasvati river at Pipli, Pehowa, Bilaspur, Dosarka (on Panchkula-Yamunanagar NH-344 near Sirsgarh) and the Theh Polar (near Sarasvati-Sindhu Civilisation archaeological site on Kaithal-Guhla SH-11). Pipli riverfront will be on the pattern Sabarmati Riverfront.

Genealogy registers

Hindu genealogy registers at Pehowa are the genealogy registers of pilgrims maintained here by pandas.'Sarasvati Temple
Pehowa is known to be an important place and pilgrimage on the banks of revered Sarasvati River. There is an ancient temple dedicated to Goddess/River Saraswati. This is another temple of this city forming a part of 48 kos parikrama of Kurukshetra.

Kartikeya Temple

Kartikeya Temple, Pehowa is a 5th century temple.

 Arunai Temple

Arunai Shiva Temple at Arunai is part of 48 kos Parikrama. In 2021, the Centre of Excellence for Research on the Saraswati River (CERSR) of Kurukshetra University excavated an ancient ghat next to Arunai temple on the paleochannel of Sarasvati River. The ghat has 12 stairs, the depth of archaeological trench and stairs is ~4 metre. According to Prof AR Chaudhri, Director of CERSR, "This bathing ghat falls on the Saraswati River paleochannel identified by CERSR and represents a unique case where the details mentioned in holy scriptures and the scientific investigations match."''

Other Major Shrines
 Dargah Peer Baba Astbali and Baba Saiyad Ali Maharaaj Ji (Dera Baba Kulwant Shah Ji) 
 Pashupathinath Mahadev Temple
 Shri Guru Ravidaas Temple and Ashram. (Managed by Sham Lal Attri) 
 Prachi Tirtha  (Part of 48 kos Parikrama)
 Brahmayoni Tirtha (Part of 48 kos Parikrama)
 Shri Dakshinmukhi Hanuman Temple
 Raghunath Ram Temple 
 Prachin Kaithal Shakti Dham Temple on Fateh Singh Road (front of old police station)Pehowa

Commercial Importance
Pehowa is a place of significant commercial importance and continues to sustain a lot of diverse industries.

Agriculture
Until about the mid-20th century, the Pehowa area was covered with dhak trees (Butea frondosa). With the introduction of irrigation, it has become one of the state’s granaries for wheat and rice.

Bricks
The city has many brick kilns and is considered as a hub of brick production. Main brick kilns of the city include Mahabir Bhatta Company situated at Arnaicha Pehowa.

See also 

 48 Kos Parikrama of Kurukshetra
 Administrative divisions of Haryana

References

Cities and towns in Kurukshetra district
48 kos parikrama of Kurukshetra